Hinman Apartments is a historic apartment building at 1629-1631 Hinman Avenue in Evanston, Illinois. Built in 1904, the three-story brick building has six apartments. Architects Atchison & Edbrooke, who also designed Evanston's Ridgewood Apartments, designed the building in the Classical Revival style. The building's design includes a two-story portico supported by Ionic columns, bow windows on either side of the portico, and a dentillated cornice and parapet. The apartments are arranged in a railroad plan, with rooms arranged along a long central hallway; while this layout was often associated with cheap apartments, the Hinman still targeted upper-class residents with its design and amenities.

The building was added to the National Register of Historic Places on March 15, 1984.

References

Buildings and structures on the National Register of Historic Places in Cook County, Illinois
Residential buildings on the National Register of Historic Places in Illinois
Buildings and structures in Evanston, Illinois
Residential buildings completed in 1904
Apartment buildings in Illinois
Neoclassical architecture in Illinois